Count   was the 12th and final daimyō of Hirosaki Domain in northern Mutsu Province, Honshū, Japan (modern-day Aomori Prefecture). His courtesy title was Tosa-no-kami, which was later upgraded to Etchū-no-kami and Jiju, and his Court rank under the Tokugawa shogunate was Junior Fourth Rank, Lower Grade.

Biography
Tsugaru Tsuguakira was the 4th son of Hosokawa Narimori, the 8th daimyō of Uto Domain, a sub-domain of Kumamoto Domain in Kyushu. He married the 4th daughter of Tsugaru Yukitsugu,  11th daimyō of Hirosaki Domain, and was adopted as his heir in 1857.

Tsuguakira became daimyō on February 7, 1859 on the retirement of Yukitsugu, and continued his predecessor's policies of modernizing and westernizing the domain's military forces.  He became daimyō during the turbulent Bakumatsu period, during which time the Tsugaru clan first sided with the pro-imperial forces of Satchō Alliance and attacked nearby Shōnai Domain. The domain then briefly defected to the pro-Tokugawa Ōuetsu Reppan Dōmei, but, for reasons yet unclear, soon backed out of the alliance and re-joined the imperial cause after a few months, participating in several battles during the Boshin War, notably that of the Battle of Noheji, and Battle of Hakodate on the pro-Meiji side.

After the Meiji Restoration, with the abolition of the han system, he was appointed Imperial Governor of Hirosaki from 1869 to 1871, at which time the territory was absorbed into the new Aomori Prefecture.

He relocated to Tokyo. With the establishment of the kazoku peerage system in 1882, Tsuguakira was awarded with the title of hakushaku (count). He died in Tokyo in 1916, and his grave is at the Yanaka Cemetery in Taitō-ku, Tokyo.

See also
Tsugaru clan

References 
 Koyasu Nobushige (1880). Buke kazoku meiyoden 武家家族名誉伝 Volume 1. Tokyo: Koyasu Nobushige. (Accessed from National Diet Library, 17 July 2008)
 Kurotaki, Jūjirō (1984). Tsugaru-han no hanzai to keibatsu 津軽藩の犯罪と刑罰. Hirosaki: Hoppō shinsha.
 Narita, Suegorō (1975). Tsugaru Tamenobu: shidan 津軽為信: 史談. Aomori: Tōō Nippōsha.
 Tsugaru Tsuguakira Kō Den kankōkai (1976). Tsugaru Tsuguakira kō-den 津輕承昭公傳. Tokyo: Rekishi Toshosha

External links
 Pictures of Tsuguakira and his wife
 "Hirosaki-jō" (17 Feb. 2008)
 "Tsugaru-han" on Edo 300 HTML

Notes

 The content of much of this article was derived from that of the corresponding article on Japanese Wikipedia.

Tozama daimyo
Tsugaru clan
Higo-Hosokawa clan
1840 births
1916 deaths
People of the Boshin War
People of Meiji-period Japan
Kazoku
Japanese bankers